Joaquim Lucas Duro de Jesus (born 6 November 1948), known as Quinito, is a Portuguese former football midfielder and manager.

Playing career
Born in Setúbal, Quinito played in exactly ten Primeira Liga seasons during his professional career, making his debut in 1967–68 with Académica de Coimbra – having moved to Coimbra to study medicine at the university– but he only appeared in eight league matches over two full seasons. He also represented C.F. Os Belenenses (six years) and S.C. Braga (two), retiring in 1980 at nearly 31 with top-division totals of 193 games and 11 goals.

Between his second and fourth clubs, Quinito played with Spain's Racing de Santander, spending three seasons in La Liga. On 28 November 1976, he scored twice in a 4–3 home win against Real Betis.

Coaching career
One year after retiring, Quinito started coaching with his last club Braga, being dismissed after the 13th round of the 1981–82 season. Until the end of the decade he worked exclusively in his country's top flight, reaching the fourth position in 1984 with precisely the Minho side.

Quinito started the 1988–89 campaign at the helm of FC Porto. Even though the team collected no losses in the first 11 matches they only won five, and he was relieved of his duties as the northerners eventually lost the title race to S.L. Benfica. The manager also spent three seasons in the second tier, notably achieving promotion in 1996 with his very first club as a player, Vitória de Setúbal.

After the ninth round of 1997–98, Quinito replaced fired Jaime Pacheco and led Vitória de Guimarães to the third position, with the subsequent qualification to the UEFA Cup. It was his second spell at the Estádio D. Afonso Henriques, following the fourth place of 1995.

Between 2008 and 2010, Quinito was an assistant coach of José Couceiro at Gaziantepspor from Turkey. Also in that decade, he worked as a director of football at Vitória Setúbal for four years.

References

External links

1948 births
Living people
Sportspeople from Setúbal
Portuguese footballers
Association football midfielders
Primeira Liga players
Associação Académica de Coimbra – O.A.F. players
C.F. Os Belenenses players
S.C. Braga players
La Liga players
Racing de Santander players
Portugal under-21 international footballers
Portuguese expatriate footballers
Expatriate footballers in Spain
Portuguese expatriate sportspeople in Spain
Portuguese football managers
Primeira Liga managers
Liga Portugal 2 managers
S.C. Braga managers
Rio Ave F.C. managers
FC Porto managers
C.S. Marítimo managers
Portimonense S.C. managers
U.D. Leiria managers
Vitória F.C. managers
Vitória S.C. managers
C.F. Os Belenenses managers
C.F. Estrela da Amadora managers
Kuwait Premier League managers
Al-Yarmouk SC (Kuwait) managers
Portuguese expatriate football managers
Expatriate football managers in Kuwait
Portuguese expatriate sportspeople in Kuwait
Portuguese expatriate sportspeople in Turkey